Utility box may refer to:

 A toolbox
 Pattress, a box that houses electrical sockets, switches, or other fixtures, also known as an electrical box
 Junction box, a box that houses electrical connections
 Electrical enclosure, a cabinet-sized box housing electrical equipment or connectors
 Pad-mounted transformer